The 1967–68 FC Bayern Munich season was the club's third season in Bundesliga.

Review and events
The club reached the UEFA Cup Winners' Cup semifinals but lost (2–0) at the hands of AC Milan. Bayern held AC Milan to a draw in the second leg but was eliminated from the competition nevertheless. Bayern was defeated in the cup semifinals by VfL Bochum.

Match results

Legend

Bundesliga

League fixtures and results

League standings

DFB-Pokal

UEFA Cup Winners' Cup

Squad information

Squad and statistics

|}

Transfers

In

Out

References

FC Bayern Munich seasons
Bayern